is a Japanese manga artist. An artist of both shōjo manga (manga for girls) and shōnen manga (manga for boys), her 1970 manga series  has been described as the first manga in the yuri (female-female romance) genre.

Biography 
Masako Yashiro was born Masako Yamamoto in 1947 in Iyomishima, Ehime. She began her career as a manga artist with the manga , published in the rental shōjo manga magazine Sumire in 1963.  Her most popular series, published a total of 28 volumes from 1964 to 1966, and had a strong impact on Japanese youth culture of the era.

Yashiro went on to become one of the most popular artists in the manga magazine Margaret following the publication of her 1970 manga series , considered by some scholars be the first manga in the yuri genre (female-female romance). Its status as the first yuri is contested: manga critic Yoshihiro Yonezawa claims Secret Love was particularly controversial and debated at the time of its publication, while manga scholar Yukari Fujimoto contends that it did not have a strong influence. Regardless, Secret Love is generally regarded as an obscure work, with most critics identifying Shiroi Heya no Futari by Ryōko Yamagishi, published in 1971, as the first yuri manga.

By end of the 1960s, she became one of the leading figures of the avant-garde magazine COM with her manga series ; her work at COM made her works known to a male audience, and she was one of the earliest female artists to create shōnen manga. She later produced manga for COM'''s sister magazine Funny, which allowed her to publish innovative new shōjo manga. Yashiro is thus considered a precursor to the Year 24 Group, a grouping of female artists who emerged in the 1970s and significantly influenced the shōjo'' genre.

References

Bibliography

1947 births
Japanese female comics artists
Living people
Women manga artists
Female comics writers
Manga artists from Ehime Prefecture